The men's 4 × 400 metres relay event was part of the track and field athletics programme at the 1924 Summer Olympics. It was the third appearance of this event.

As for all other events the track was 500 metres in circumference. Twenty-eight runners from seven nations competed.

Records
These were the standing world and Olympic records (in minutes) prior to the 1924 Summer Olympics.

In the final, the United States team set a new world record with 3:16.0.

Results

Round 1

The heats were held on Saturday, July 12, 1924, and started at 4 p.m. The top two in each heat qualified for the semi-finals which means that only one team (Finland) was eliminated.

Heat 1

Heat 2

Heat 3

Final

The final was held on Sunday, July 13, 1924, and was started at 5:15 p.m.

References

External links
Olympic Report
 

Men's relay 4x400 metre
Relay foot races at the Olympics